Bulbophyllum nutans is a species of epiphytic orchid native to Madagascar and the Mascarene Islands in the family of Orchidaceae. They form into a cluster, creating a group of green-like bulb appearance that form pseudobulbs with cotyledon-like leaves on top that usually has two leaves. The orchids form an inflorescence of white-golden like flowers that shoot out from beneath the orchid's pseudobulbs.

References

nutans